Francisco Martín "Pako" Ayestarán Barandiarán (born 5 February 1963) is a Spanish football manager and coach, who is currently the assistant manager at Premier League club Aston Villa.

He spent 11 years as assistant to Rafael Benítez at clubs including Valencia and Liverpool. Starting in 2013, he managed as head coach in Mexico, Israel, Portugal, and at Valencia and Las Palmas in La Liga.

Career

Assistant manager
Ayestarán was born in Beasain, Gipuzkoa, and had a short stint as a youth player at Real Sociedad. After starting his career as a fitness coach, he was appointed Rafael Benítez's assistant at Osasuna, and remained behind the manager at Extremadura, Tenerife, Valencia and Liverpool. On 1 September 2007, Ayestarán announced his departure from The Reds after 11 years partnering Benítez. Benítez accused Ayestarán of "betrayal" as Ayestarán "contacted other clubs behind his back" while Ayestarán rejected the accusations, claiming instead that Benítez "forgot his principles".

Ayestarán joined Real Sociedad as sporting director in 2008, but left after a few weeks due to conflicts with the club president. He then served as fitness coach at Benfica and Valencia, leaving the latter in June 2010 for "professional reasons". In mid-2011, Ayestarán was named Quique Sánchez Flores' assistant at Al-Ahli Dubai, but left the club roughly a year later.

Manager
On 24 August 2013, Ayestarán took up coaching, being appointed at the helm of Estudiantes Tecos. On 29 May 2014, after failing to win promotion despite reaching the final of the tournament, Ayestarán announced his departure from Tecos, saying he had "no intention of continuing to manage in the Ascenso MX".

Ayestarán was appointed Maccabi Tel Aviv manager on 26 August 2014, replacing fellow Spaniard Óscar García who had resigned due to the war in Gaza. He led Maccabi to a first-ever treble in Israeli football, winning the Premier League (the club's third in a row), the State Cup and the Toto Cup. On 20 August 2015, however, he resigned from the club.

On 20 August 2015, Ayestarán returned to Mexico, being appointed at the helm of Santos Laguna. He and the club terminated his contract on 21 November "upon mutual consent" after a 15th-place finish in the Apertura 2015.

It was announced on 14 February 2016 that Ayestarán would join Gary Neville's backroom staff at Valencia. On 31 March, he was appointed manager of the club for the remainder of the season after the Englishman's sacking. He suffered defeat against Las Palmas in his debut match before recording consecutive La Liga wins over Sevilla, Barcelona and Eibar in April.

On 24 May 2016, Ayestarán was appointed Valencia manager until 30 June 2018. However, he was sacked on 20 September with the team in last place in the league table, having lost all four games of the season and 8 of his overall 12 fixtures.

Ayestarán replaced Manolo Márquez as the new Las Palmas manager on 27 September 2017. He recorded 1 draw and 6 defeats before his dismissal on 30 November, as the Canary Islands club suffered relegation.

On 29 May 2018, Ayestarán returned to Mexico's top flight to become manager of Pachuca. He was sacked on 20 January 2019, after missing the Apertura play-offs and underperforming three games into the Clausura season.

Ayestarán returned to work on 10 August 2020 with a two-year contract at Tondela in Portugal's Primeira Liga. He succeeded his fellow Basque Natxo González in the job. With a 3–1 home win over Estoril on 21 December 2021, he guided the team to the quarter-finals of the Taça de Portugal for the first time in their history.

On 16 March 2022, after a run of five losses and a draw in the league, Ayestarán was dismissed by Tondela. Nonetheless, the team had a 3–0 lead to take into their cup semi-final second leg against Mafra.

Assistant head coach
On 4 November 2022, Ayestarán was officially announced as assistant head coach to Unai Emery at Aston Villa.

Managerial statistics

Honours
Tecos
Ascenso MX: 2014 Clausura

Maccabi Tel Aviv
Israeli Premier League: 2014–15
Israel State Cup: 2014–15
Toto Cup: 2014–15

Liverpool
UEFA Champions League: 2004–05

Valencia
La Liga: 2003–04

References

External links
Liga MX profile 

1963 births
Living people
People from Beasain
Spanish football managers
Liverpool F.C. non-playing staff
Tecos F.C. managers
Santos Laguna managers
Maccabi Tel Aviv F.C. managers
Valencia CF managers
UD Las Palmas managers
C.D. Tondela managers
La Liga managers
Israeli Premier League managers
Spanish expatriate sportspeople in England
Spanish expatriate sportspeople in Mexico
Spanish expatriate sportspeople in Israel
Spanish expatriate sportspeople in the United Arab Emirates
Spanish expatriate sportspeople in Portugal
Spanish expatriate football managers
Expatriate football managers in Mexico
Expatriate football managers in Israel
Expatriate football managers in Portugal
Sportspeople from Gipuzkoa
Aston Villa F.C. non-playing staff